is a Japanese video game for the  MSX2 home computer system and Family Computer featuring former comedian Masashi Tashiro released in 1989.

Summary
The story is about the hero Masashi Tashiro who has to rescue the four princesses in distress. One happy ending and four unhappy endings were used in the game; becoming one of the first video games to have multiple endings. The game was not very successful, but it started appearing frequently and getting high prices on online auction sites like Yahoo! after 2000, when Masashi Tashiro was arrested and convicted several times in connection with voyeurism and drug abuse.

References

Nintendo Entertainment System games
MSX2 games
1989 video games
Japan-exclusive video games
Epic/Sony Records games
HAL Laboratory games
Video games developed in Japan